The 2002 NFL Europe season was the tenth season in 12 years of the American Football league that started out as the World League of American Football. The Barcelona Dragons changed their names to FC Barcelona Dragons.

World Bowl X
Berlin 26-20 Rhein
Saturday, June 22, 2002 Rheinstadion  Düsseldorf, Germany.

References 

 
2002 in American football
NFL Europe (WLAF) seasons